Finn Jones (born Terence Jones; 24 March 1988) is an English actor known for his roles as Loras Tyrell in the HBO series Game of Thrones (2011–2016) and Danny Rand / Iron Fist in the Netflix television shows Iron Fist (2017–2018), The Defenders (2017), and Luke Cage (2018), which are set within the Marvel Cinematic Universe.

Career
Jones trained at the Arts Educational Schools on a three-year acting course. Prior to this he was a Sixth Form student at Hayes School in Bromley.

In October 2009, Jones played Jamie, a young man who found love with Hannah Ashworth in the second series of Hollyoaks Later. Later, he returned to the Hollyoaks village to tie in with Emma Rigby's (Hannah Ashworth) departure in February 2010.

In January 2010, Jones appeared in the 11th series of Doctors. On 1 and 8 April 2010, he appeared in two episodes of The Bill playing Commander Lisa Kennedy's (played by Julie Graham) son Mark Kennedy, who was accused of murder. In the same month he finished filming for a new online drama called The Curfew commissioned by Channel 4 and produced by BAFTA award-winning company LittleLoud Productions.

Jones also played Santiago Jones in the Doctor Who spin-off The Sarah Jane Adventures in the story Death of the Doctor alongside Katy Manning as former Doctor Who companion Jo Grant and Matt Smith as the Eleventh Doctor.

On 19 June 2010, it was announced that Jones would be appearing in Game of Thrones, the HBO adaptation of George R. R. Martin's A Song of Ice and Fire novel series, as Ser Loras Tyrell. He also had a small role in the 2012 horror film Wrong Turn 5: Bloodlines.

In 2014, he starred in two films, Sleeping Beauty and The Last Showing. It was reported in February 2016, that Jones was cast as Danny Rand / Iron Fist for the Marvel Television/Netflix series, Iron Fist, set within the larger Marvel Cinematic Universe. In March 2016, Marvel officially confirmed that Jones was cast as Danny Rand. Jones reprised the role in The Defenders and the second season of Luke Cage and Iron Fist.

In 2019, it was announced that Jones would join the second season of the Peabody Award-winning series Dickinson on Apple TV+, playing Samuel Bowles.

Personal life
Jones' birth name is Terence Jones. He changed it to avoid confusion with Terry Jones, a member of Monty Python.

In December 2015, Jones assisted Oxfam campaigners in raising money for their appeal to support Syrian refugees, by singing carols at a shopping centre in Islington. He appeared alongside Jeremy Corbyn, the Leader of the Labour Party, and later voiced his support for Corbyn in a post on Instagram.

Filmography

Film

Television

References

External links
 

English male television actors
Living people
1988 births
21st-century English male actors
English male film actors
People educated at the Arts Educational Schools
Male actors from London